Conus paukstisi is a species of sea snail, a marine gastropod mollusk in the family Conidae, the cone snails, cone shells or cones.

These snails are predatory and venomous. They are capable of "stinging" humans.

Description
The size of the shell varies between 9 mm and 35 mm.

Distribution
This marine species occurs off Hawaii.

References

 Jiménez-Tenorio,  A Revision of the Status of Several Conoid Taxa from the Hawaiian Islands
 Puillandre N., Duda T.F., Meyer C., Olivera B.M. & Bouchet P. (2015). One, four or 100 genera? A new classification of the cone snails. Journal of Molluscan Studies. 81: 1-23

External links
 To World Register of Marine Species
 

paukstisi
Gastropods described in 2011